Kotan-kar-kamuy (コタンカㇽカムイ, lit. 'world-making-god') is the creator deity of the Ainu people. He should not be confused with god of the land Kotan-kor-kamuy, or the god of the sky Kandakoro Kamuy.

According to missionary John Batchelor, all kamuy are intermediaries responsible to Kotan-kar-kamuy in the Ainu religion, who is regarded as the almighty and eternal ruler of the universe. This led to assumptions that the Ainu faith had originally been monotheistic. Although he stands on top of the hierarchy of gods in Ainu mythology he is only rarely worshipped. Therefore, Norbert Richard Adami criticises the monotheism theory, and holds that Batchelor's views leading into this direction resulted from a straitened and sometimes misinterpreted mode of perception based on his faith, through which they would lose in value.

References 

Ainu kamuy
Creator gods